Gregory Francis Selinger  (born February 16, 1951) is a Canadian former politician who served as the 21st premier of Manitoba from 2009 until 2016, leading an NDP government. From 1999 to 2009 he was the Minister of Finance in the government of his immediate predecessor, Gary Doer. Selinger was the member of the Legislative Assembly of Manitoba for St. Boniface from 1999 until his resignation in early 2018. His party was defeated by Brian Pallister and the Progressive Conservatives in the 2016 Manitoba general election.

Early life and education 
Selinger was born in Regina, Saskatchewan, the son of Margaret Eva (Crawford) and Nicodemus Selinger. He came to Manitoba from Saskatchewan as a child with his single mother, who ran a small clothing store in Winnipeg.

Selinger received a Bachelor of Social Work from the University of Manitoba, a Master of Public Administration from Queen's University, and a PhD from the London School of Economics.

Before entering politics, he worked as an associate professor in the Faculty of Social Work at the University of Manitoba, and sat on the boards of the St. Boniface Hospital, the St. Boniface Museum, the Community Income Tax Service Boards, and as president of the Old St. Boniface Residents Association.

Municipal politics 
After joining an alliance of progressive municipal politicians called Winnipeg into the '90s in the late 1980s, Selinger was elected to the Winnipeg City Council in 1989 as a candidate of the alliance in St. Boniface, defeating incumbent Guy Savoie. During his time as a city councillor, Selinger was a member of the Executive Policy Committee and was the chair of the Committee on Finance and Administration.

In 1992, Selinger ran for Mayor of Winnipeg and came in second place, losing to Susan Thompson. Some have attributed his loss to his refusal to accept corporate and union donations, which he based on principle. The 1992 civic election had 17 nominated candidates running for Mayor which resulted in votes getting split amongst several candidates similarly aligned on the political spectrum.

Post municipal career 

Following his failed mayoral bid, Selinger stepped back from politics and returned to teaching at the University of Manitoba.

Provincial politics

Minister of Finance 
Selinger was easily elected to the Manitoba legislature in the provincial election of 1999, defeating his closest opponent, Liberal Jean-Paul Boily, by 5439 votes to 2994 in the Winnipeg riding of St. Boniface.

Selinger was appointed Minister of Finance, after the 1999 election, in Gary Doer's first cabinet, and was also given responsibility for French Language Services, the administration of the Crown Corporations Review and Accountability Act and the administration of the Manitoba Hydro Act. In his ten years as Minister of Finance, Selinger balanced every budget. On January 17, 2001, he was also given responsibility for the Civil Service.

Following a cabinet shuffle on September 25, 2002, he was charged with the administration of the Liquor Control Act, while being relieved of his duties for the Manitoba Hydro Act.

In 2003, Selinger supported Bill Blaikie's campaign to lead the federal New Democratic Party.

Selinger was re-elected in the provincial election of 2003 with almost 75% of the vote in his riding. On November 4, 2003, he was relieved of responsibilities for the Liquor Control Act; on October 12, 2004, he was made responsible for the Public Utilities Board.

In January 2005, Selinger announced that his government would change its system of accounting for expenditures and revenues. This followed a request from Auditor General Jon Singleton, who criticized the government for listing crown corporation losses and other matters as off-budget spending. Selinger is considered a strong performer in the Doer Cabinet.

He was re-elected in the 2007 provincial election.

On June 28, 2007, Selinger regained responsibility for the administration of the Liquor Control Act and was charged with the administration of The Manitoba Lotteries Corporation Act.

Premier 
On September 8, 2009, Selinger resigned from his cabinet position and announced his candidacy for the leadership of the New Democratic Party of Manitoba. He was running against fellow cabinet ministers Steve Ashton and Andrew Swan until Swan dropped out of the race on September 28. The leadership convention took place on October 17, 2009. Rosann Wowchuk replaced Selinger as interim Minister of Finance. He defeated his leadership rival, Steve Ashton, taking 1,317 votes among delegates, to Ashton's 685. Selinger was sworn in as Premier of Manitoba by the Lieutenant Governor of Manitoba on October 19, 2009, the same day that Gary Doer was sworn in as Canadian Ambassador to the United States. Despite predictions of defeat, Selinger led the NDP to its fourth straight majority government in the October 2011 general election, surpassing Doer's record and winning 37 seats.

In April 2013, the Selinger government reneged on an earlier promise to not increase sales taxes by implementing a 1% increase in the provincial sales tax rate from 7% to 8%, which resulted in a precipitous decline in popular support for the government and, ultimately, a caucus revolt against Selinger's leadership culminating in the resignation of five cabinet ministers. Due, in part, to the unpopularity of the tax increase, the NDP fell far behind the Progressive Conservatives in public opinion polls and never recovered. In the fall of 2014 several cabinet ministers privately asked Selinger to resign in hopes that the party would recover under a new leader, but he declined. In September 2014, during a caucus retreat, several MLAs openly told Selinger he needed to resign but he refused.

A month later, at the end of October Minister of Finance Jennifer Howard (Fort Rouge), Minister of Municipal Government Stan Struthers (Dauphin), Minister for Jobs and the Economy Theresa Oswald (Seine River), Andrew Swan (Minto), Minister of Health  Erin Selby (Southdale), and several senior party officials went public with their call for Selinger's resignation. Selinger asked ministers, labeled the "gang of five" in the media,  to either disavow their public statements or quit. The five resigned on Monday, November 3. The same day Selinger said in a statement he was saddened by their decisions but had made it clear they could either "focus on the priorities of Manitoba families as part of our team, or resign." Selinger accepted the resignations of the five senior cabinet ministers and installed their replacements hours later. On November 9, Selinger asked the party executive to hold a leadership election during the party's annual convention scheduled for March 6–8, 2015, stating his intention to be a candidate. The party executive subsequently agreed. Theresa Oswald, one of the five rebel ex-ministers, challenged Selinger for the leadership as did Minister of Infrastructure and Transportation Steve Ashton who had not protested against Selinger but who resigned from cabinet to enter leadership contest.

At the March 8, 2015 leadership election, Ashton was eliminated on the first ballot and Selinger prevailed on the second ballot with 50.93% of ballots cast, defeating Oswald by 33 votes.

Selinger's popularity never recovered after his party raised the PST in 2013. By the time the writs were dropped for the 2016 provincial election, the NDP had been well behind the Tories in opinion polling for almost four years. The NDP was heavily defeated, falling to only 14 seats, its smallest seat count in three decades.

After politics
Selinger resigned as party leader following his government's defeat and returned to the backbench. Selinger announced on February 20, 2018, that he was resigning his seat in the legislature effective March 7, 2018. He continues to live in Winnipeg.

Electoral record

References

External links 

 
 Official New Democratic Party profile

1951 births
Alumni of the London School of Economics
Living people
Finance ministers of Manitoba
Manitoba CCF/NDP leaders
Members of the Executive Council of Manitoba
Premiers of Manitoba
Queen's University at Kingston alumni
University of Manitoba alumni
Winnipeg city councillors
Canadian social work academics
Politicians from Regina, Saskatchewan
21st-century Canadian politicians
New Democratic Party of Manitoba MLAs
Members of the Order of Manitoba